Frederick William "Fred" Wallner (born April 28, 1928, in Greenfield, MassachusettsNovember 4, 1999)  was an American football guard who played five seasons in the National Football League and one season (1960) with the Houston Oilers of the American Football League.  He was a member of the Oilers' first AFL Championship team.

See also
Other American Football League players

References

1928 births
1999 deaths
Players of American football from Massachusetts
American football offensive guards
Notre Dame Fighting Irish football players
Chicago Cardinals players
Houston Oilers players
Eastern Conference Pro Bowl players
People from Greenfield, Massachusetts
American Football League players